Siberia Governorate was an administrative division (a guberniya) of the Tsardom of Russia and then the Russian Empire, which existed from 1708 until 1782. Its seat was in Tobolsk (initially spelt as Tobolesk). The governorate was located in the east of Russian Empire and bordered China in the south, Kazan Governorate in the southwest, and Archangelgorod Governorate in the northwest. In the north and the east, the governorate was limited by the seas of the Arctic and Pacific Oceans. In terms of area, Siberia Governorate was by far the biggest of all the governorates, as it included areas in the Urals, Siberia, and the Russian Far East some of which were not yet even settled by Russians at the time.

Establishment
As with the rest of the governorates, neither the borders nor internal subdivisions of Siberia Governorate were defined; instead, the territory was defined as a set of cities and the lands adjacent to those cities.

At the time of establishment, the following thirty cities were included in Siberia Governorate:
(listed as towns)
Beryozov
Ilimskoy
Irkutskoy
Ketskoy
Krasny Yar
Kuznetskoy
Mangazeya
Narym
Nerchinskoy
Pelym
Surgut
Tara
Tobolesk
Tomskoy
Turinsk
Tyumen
Verkhoturye
Yakutskoy
Yeniseysk
(listed as Pomor towns)
Cherdyn
Kay Gorodok
Kungur
Perm Velikaya
Sol Kamskaya
Vyatka with four unnamed suburbs
Yarensk

Transformations and disestablishment

In 1719, the governorate was divided into three provinces: Vyatka, Solikamsk, and Tobolsk. Simultaneously, Yarensky Uyezd with the administrative center of Yarensk was moved from Siberia Governorate to Archangelgorod Governorate.

In 1724, Tobolsk Province was split into Yeniseysk, Irkutsk, and Tobolsk Provinces. In 1727, Vyatka and Solikamsk Provinces were transferred to Kazan Governorate.

In 1736, Okhotsky Uyezd was split off from Yakutsky Uyezd. In the same year, Siberia Governorate was split into two independent areas: Siberia Province, which consisted of the former Tobolsk and Yeniseysk Provinces, under the authority of the governor (posted in Tobolsk), and Irkutsk Province. In 1737, the areas in the South Urals were organized into Iset Province with the center in the town of Shadrinsk, and the province was transferred into Orenburg Governorate. In 1764, Irkutsk Governorate was established in place of the former Irkutsk Province.

In 1782, Siberia Governorate was abolished, and its area split into Tobolsk Viceroyalty and Kolyvan Viceroyalty. Irkutsk Governorate was transformed into Irkutsk Viceroyalty.

Governors
The administration of the governorate was performed by a governor. The governors of Siberia Governorate were:
1708–1714 Matvey Petrovich Gagarin
1714–1716 Ivan Bibikov (acting governor)
1716–1719 Matvey Petrovich Gagarin, imprisoned in 1719 and executed by hanging in 1721 for corruption;
1719–1724 Alexey Mikhaylovich Cherkassky
1724–1726 Mikhail Vladimirovich Dolgorukov
1726–1727 Alexey Mikhaylovich Surov (acting governor)
1727–1728 Mikhail Vladimirovich Dolgorukov
1728–1731 Ivan Vasilyevich Boltin (vice-governor, acting governor)
1730 Vasily Lukich Dolgorukov (never arrived to Tobolsk, imprisoned and subsequently executed in 1739)
1731–1736 Alexey Lvovich Pleshcheyev
1736–1741 Pyotr Ivanovich Buturlin
1741–1742 Ivan Afanasyevich Shipov
1742–1752 Alexey Mikhaylovich Sukharev
1754–1757 Vasily Alexeyevich Myatlev
1757–1763 Fyodor Ivanovich Soymonov
1763–1780 Denis Ivanovich Chicherin

See also

References

Governorates of the Russian Empire
States and territories established in 1708
1708 establishments in Russia
1782 disestablishments in the Russian Empire
History of Siberia